Mount Hunter may refer to:
 Mount Hunter (Alaska)
 Mount Hunter (Antarctica)
 Mount Hunter, New South Wales, site of the residence of Mark Latham

ca:Mont Hunter